Dennis Arakaki (born October 18, 1943) was an American politician and social worker.

Born in Honolulu, Hawaii, Arakaki graduated from Farrington High School. He then went to University of Hawaii at Manoa. He worked in health care planning. Arakaki served in the Hawaii House of Representatives from 1985 to 2006 as a Democrat.

Notes

1943 births
Living people
Politicians from Honolulu
University of Hawaiʻi at Mānoa alumni
Democratic Party members of the Hawaii House of Representatives